The Taiping Guangji, sometimes translated as the Extensive Records of the Taiping Era, or Extensive Records of the Taiping Xinguo Period, is a collection of stories compiled in the early Song dynasty. The work was completed in 978, and printing blocks were cut, but it was prevented from publication on the grounds that it contained only xiaoshuo (fiction or "insignificant tellings") and thus "was of no use to young students." It survived in manuscript until it was published in the Ming dynasty. It is considered one of the Four Great Books of Song (宋四大書). The title refers to the Taiping Xinguo era (太平興國, "great-peace rejuvenate-nation", 976–984 AD), the first years of the reign of Emperor Taizong of Song.

The collection is divided into 500 volumes and consists of about 3 million Chinese characters. It includes 7,021 stories selected from over three hundred books and novels from the Han dynasty to the early Song dynasty, many of which have been lost. Some stories are historical or naturalistic anecdotes, each is replete with historical elements, and were not regarded by their authors as fiction, but the topics are mostly supernatural, about Buddhist and Taoist priests, immortals, ghosts, and various deities. They include a number of Tang dynasty stories, especially chuanqi (tales of wonder), that are famous works of literature in their own right, and also inspired later works. 

In the 17th century, the vernacular novelist and short story writer Feng Menglong produced an abridged edition, Taiping Guangji Chao (太平廣記鈔), reducing the number of stories to 2,500 in 80 volumes.

Pu Songling was said to have been inspired by Taiping Guangji; the short story "A Sequel to the Yellow Millet Dream" parallels one of Taiping stories.

Contents
The Taiping Guangji was compiled by Wang Kezhen (王克贞), Song Bai (宋白), Hu Meng (扈蒙), Xu Xuan (徐铉), Zhao Linji (赵邻几), Lü Wenzhong (吕文仲), Li Fang (李昉), Li Mu (李穆), and others.
The Tale of Li Wa by Bai Xingjian
Huo Xiaoyu's Story by Jiang Fang this story has been translated by Stephen Owen to English in Anthology of Chinese Literature, Beginnings to 1911 (1996)
The Tale of Liu Yi translated as The Dragon King's Daughter by Yang Xianyi and Gladys Yang

References

Sources 
 Allen, Sarah M. (2014), Shifting Stories: History, Gossip, and Love in Narratives from Tang Dynasty China. Cambridge: Harvard University Press.
 Charles E. Hammond, "T'ang Legends: History and Hearsay" Tamkang Review 20.4 (summer 1990), pp. 359–82.
 .
Cheng, Yizhong, "Taiping Guangji" ("Extensive Records of the Taiping Era "). Encyclopedia of China (Chinese Literature Edition), 1st ed., via archive.org.
Kurz, Johannes. "The Compilation and Publication of the Taiping yulan and the Cefu yuangui", in Florence Bretelle-Establet and Karine Chemla (eds.), Qu'est-ce qu'écrire une encyclopédie en Chine?. Extreme Orient-Extreme Occident Hors série (2007), 39–76.

Chinese literature
Chinese prose texts
10th-century Chinese books
Song dynasty literature
Chinese short story collections
Leishu
978
Chinese anthologies
Chinese encyclopedias